FR4 may refer to:

 FR-4 or FR4, a NEMA grade designation for glass-reinforced epoxy laminate material
 The Magister, the fourth supplement of the Forgotten Realms series role-playing game
 France 4, a television channel in France